A fisherman is someone who captures fish and other animals from a body of water, or gathers shellfish

Fisherman, Fishermen or variants thereof may refer to:

Music
 The Fisherman, an orchestral composition by Bedrich Smetana (1824–1884)
 Fiskarena (The Fishermen) (VB 40), by Joseph Martin Kraus (1756–1792) 
 The Fishermen , a band of Pete Finestone of Bad Religion
 "Fisherman", song by The Congos from Heart of the Congos 1977
 "Fisherman", song by Brian May
 "Fisherman", song by Yancey Boys from Sunset Blvd. 2013	
 "Fisherman", song by The Iveys from album

Novels
 The Fisherman (novel), a 2016 horror novel by John Langan
 The Fishermen (Grigorovich novel) 1853
 The Fishermen (Kirk novel), 1928 novel, the best-selling Danish book of all time
 The Fishermen (Obioma novel) 2015

Poems
 "Der Fischer (Goethe)" (The Fisherman), by Goethe
 "The Fisherman", a poem by Jane Wilde, influential on her son Oscar Wilde
 "The Fisherman", by William Butler Yeats
 "The Fisherman", by the Slovene Romantic poet France Prešeren
 "The Fisherman", by Abbie Farwell Brown
 "Yu Fu" or "The Fisherman", traditionally attributed to Qu Yuan

Sculptures
 The Fisherman (Puerto Vallarta), Mexico
 The Fishermen (sculpture), Puerto Vallarta, Mexico
 The Fisherman, a relief at the pedestal of the Prešeren Monument (Ljubljana), Slovenia
 The Fisherman (Eureka, California), United States

Other uses
 Fisherman (American horse), an American racehorse
 Fisherman (English horse), an English racehorse
 Fisherman (comics), several DC Comics characters
 Fisherman, British Columbia, Canada, a ghost town
 Fisherman, a troop in the mobile game Clash Royale

See also
 Fisherman Island (disambiguation)
 Dumuzid the Fisherman, a legendary Sumerian king of Uruk